Latvia competed at the 2016 Summer Olympics in Rio de Janeiro, Brazil, from 5 to 21 August 2016. This was the nation's seventh consecutive appearance at the Games in the post-Soviet era and eleventh overall in Summer Olympic history.

The Latvian Olympic Committee sent the nation's smallest delegation to the Olympics since 2004, with 33 athletes, 20 men and 13 women, competing across 12 sports. Latvia made its Olympic debut in women's tennis and women's weightlifting, as well as its return to sailing after 12 years. Athletics had the largest team by sport with only 14 competitors, nearly half of the nation's full roster size; along with sailing and tennis, there was also a single competitor each in modern pentathlon, shooting, and wrestling.

The Latvian roster featured two returning Olympic medalists from London, namely beach volleyball player Jānis Šmēdiņš and two-time defending BMX champion Maris Strombergs. Hunting for his third consecutive gold medal in Rio de Janeiro, Strombergs was selected to lead the Latvian delegation as the flag bearer in the opening ceremony. Distance runner Jeļena Prokopčuka came out of retirement to run for the women's marathon at her fourth Games as the oldest (aged 40) and most experienced competitor, while windsurfer Ketija Birzule and weightlifter Rebeka Koha (women's 53 kg) entered their maiden Games as the youngest athletes (both 18) of the roster. Other notable Latvian athletes included heptathlete and 2015 world bronze medalist Laura Ikauniece-Admidiņa, reigning European javelin throw champion Zigismunds Sirmais, and world-ranked freestyle wrestler Anastasija Grigorjeva.

Latvia failed to win a single medal for the first time in Olympic history since its independence from the Soviet Union in 1991. Koha, Ikauniece-Admidiņa, and sprint kayaker Aleksejs Rumjancevs produced the strongest results for the Latvians at these Games, finishing among the top five in their respective sporting events.

Athletics
 
Latvian athletes achieved qualifying standards in the following athletics events (up to a maximum of 3 athletes in each event):

Track & road events
Men

Women

Field events

Combined events – Women's heptathlon

Canoeing

Sprint
Latvia has qualified a single boat in men's K-1 200 m for the Games at the 2016 European Qualification Regatta in Duisburg, Germany, either by winning his event or when the quota place for his event passed to the highest finisher not qualified Meanwhile, an unused men's C-1 1000 m boat was awarded to the Latvian canoeing team, as a response to the "multiple positive cases" of doping on Belarus and Romania.

Qualification Legend: FA = Qualify to final (medal); FB = Qualify to final B (non-medal)

Cycling

Road
Latvian riders qualified for a maximum of two quota places in the men's Olympic road race by virtue of their top 15 final national ranking in the 2015 UCI Europe Tour.

BMX
Latvian riders qualified for two men's quota places in BMX at the Olympics, as a result of the nation's sixth-place finish in the UCI Olympic Ranking List of May 31, 2016. Two-time defending BMX champion Māris Štrombergs and London 2012 Olympian Edžus Treimanis were selected to the Latvian team.

Judo

Latvia has qualified two judokas for each of the following weight classes at the Games. Remarkably going to his third Olympics, Jevgeņijs Borodavko was ranked among the top 22 eligible judokas for men in the IJF World Ranking List of May 30, 2016, while Artūrs Ņikiforenko at men's heavyweight (+100 kg) earned a continental quota spot from the European region, as the highest-ranked Latvian judoka outside of direct qualifying position.

Modern pentathlon

Latvia has qualified one modern pentathlete for the men's event at the Games. Following the exclusion of the Russian athletes as a response to their previous doping cases, Ukrainian-born Ruslans Nakoņečnijs received a spare berth as the next highest-ranked eligible modern pentathlete, not yet qualified, in the UIPM World Rankings.

Sailing
 
Latvia has received a spare Olympic berth from the International Sailing Federation to send a windsurfer competing in the women's RS:X class to the Olympic regatta, signifying the nation's Olympic return to the sport for the first time since 2004.

M = Medal race; EL = Eliminated – did not advance into the medal race

Shooting
 
Latvia has received an invitation from ISSF to send Dainis Upelnieks in the men's skeet to the Olympics, as long as the minimum qualifying score (MQS) was fulfilled by March 31, 2016.

Qualification Legend: Q = Qualify for the next round; q = Qualify for the bronze medal (shotgun)

Swimming

Latvia has received a Universality invitation from FINA to send two swimmers (one male and one female) to the Olympics.

Tennis

Latvia has entered one tennis player into the Olympic tournament. Jeļena Ostapenko (world no. 39) qualified directly for the women's singles, as one of the top 56 eligible players in the ATP and WTA World Rankings as of June 6, 2016.

Volleyball

Beach
Latvia men's beach volleyball team qualified directly for the Olympics by virtue of their nation's top 15 placement in the FIVB Olympic Rankings as of June 13, 2016. The place was awarded to the newly-formed duo of London 2012 bronze medalist Jānis Šmēdiņš and two-time Olympian Aleksandrs Samoilovs.

Weightlifting

Latvia has qualified one male weightlifter for the Olympics by virtue of his top 15 individual finish, among those who had not secured any quota places through the World or European Championships, in the IWF World Rankings as of June 20, 2016. The place was awarded to London 2012 Olympian Artūrs Plēsnieks in the men's heavyweight division (105 kg).

Meanwhile, an unused women's Olympic spot was added to the Latvian weightlifting team by IWF, as a response to the vacancy of women's quota places in the individual World Rankings and to the "multiple positive cases" of doping on several nations.

Wrestling

Latvia has qualified one wrestler for the women's freestyle 63 kg into the Olympic competition, as a result of her top six finish at the 2015 World Championships.

Women's freestyle

See also
Latvia at the 2016 Summer Paralympics

References

External links 

 

Olympics
2016
Nations at the 2016 Summer Olympics